The 2004–05 St. John's Red Storm men's basketball team represented St. John's University during the 2004–05 NCAA Division I men's basketball season. The team was coached by Norm Roberts in his first year at the school replacing interim head coach Kevin Clark. St. John's home games are played at Carnesecca Arena and Madison Square Garden and the team is a member of the Big East Conference.

Off season

Departures

Class of 2004 signees

Transfer additions

Roster

Schedule and results

|-
!colspan=9 style="background:#FF0000; color:#FFFFFF;"| Exhibition

|-
!colspan=9 style="background:#FF0000; color:#FFFFFF;"| Non-Conference Regular Season

|-
!colspan=9 style="background:#FF0000; color:#FFFFFF;"| Big East Conference Regular Season

References

St. John's Red Storm men's basketball seasons
St. John's
St John
St John